Vik is a locality situated in Simrishamn Municipality, Skåne County, Sweden with 319 inhabitants in 2010.

References 

Populated places in Skåne County
Populated places in Simrishamn Municipality